Frank McLaughlin may refer to:

 Frank McLaughlin (artist) (1935–2020), American comics artist 
 Frank McLaughlin (baseball) (1856–1917), infielder for Major League Baseball
 Frank McLaughlin (sailor) (born 1960), Canadian sailor

See also
Frank McLoughlin (disambiguation)